Sonna was an American post-rock band from Baltimore, Maryland, United States.  The band formed in 1998, and  released two full-length albums on label Temporary Residence, of which guitarist Jeremy deVine is the owner.

In 2016, Temporary Residence issued a compilation album consisting of the band's non-album output.

Discography

Studio albums
We Sing Loud Sing Soft Tonight (2001, Temporary Residence)
Smile and the World Smiles with You (2002, Temporary Residence)

Compilations
Keep It Together (2016, Temporary Residence)

EPs
These Windows are Pistons (1999, Temporary Residence)
Travels in Constants, Vol. 6: The Eventual Bow (2000, Temporary Residence)

Singles, split EPs, and collaborations
Way to Breathe No Breath (split single with Paul Newman) (1999, Temporary Residence)
Kept Luminesce / Mirameko Single (2000, Static Caravan / 2001, Temporary Residence)
Make Shift Carousel (collaboration w/ Sybarite & Lilienthal) (2002 Zeal / 2002, Temporary Residence)

Band members
Drew Nelson – Bass
Chris Mackie – Guitar
Jim Redd – Drums
Jeremy deVine – Guitar

See also
List of post-rock bands

References

Musical groups from Baltimore
Temporary Residence Limited artists